Orthanc is a standalone DICOM server. It is designed to improve the DICOM flows in hospitals and to support research about the automated analysis of medical images. Orthanc lets its users focus on the content of the DICOM files, hiding the complexity of the DICOM format and of the DICOM protocol. It is licensed under the GPLv3.

Orthanc can turn any computer running Windows, Linux or OS X into a DICOM store (in other words, a mini-PACS system). Its architecture is standalone, meaning that no complex database administration is required, nor the installation of third-party dependencies.  Orthanc is also available as Docker images.

Orthanc provides a RESTful API on top of a DICOM server. Therefore, it is possible to drive Orthanc from any computer language. The DICOM tags of the stored medical images can be downloaded in the JSON file format. Furthermore, standard PNG images can be generated on the fly from the DICOM instances by Orthanc.

Plugins

Orthanc also features a plugin mechanism to add new modules that extends the core capabilities of its REST API. As of May 2022, a dozen of plugins are available:

 multiple DICOM Web viewers,
 a PostgreSQL database back-end, 
 a MySQL database back-end,
 an ODBC database back-end,
 a reference implementation of DICOMweb,
 a Whole Slide Imaging viewer and tools to convert to/from WSI formats.
 3 Object_storage storage back-end,
 a Python_(programming_language) plugin
 a plugin to access data from The_Cancer_Imaging_Archive
 a plugin to index a local storage
 a plugin to handle Neuroimaging file formats
 and more

History & awards

Orthanc was initiated by Sébastien Jodogne in 2011 while working at CHU de Liège.

For his work on Orthanc, Sébastien Jodogne received the Free Software Award for 2014. Orthanc also received the eHealth Agoria award for 2015.

From 2015, the development has also been supported by Osimis, still with Sébastien Jodogne as the main contributor.

Since 2021, the development is provided by UCLouvain with Sébastien Jodogne and by Alain Mazy with financial support from Osimis and from Open Collective

Distribution
Orthanc is part of the Debian Med project. Official packages are available for numerous Linux distributions including Debian, Ubuntu and Fedora. Ports are available for FreeBSD and OpenBSD. Windows/MacOS binary installer packages may be freely downloaded from the Orthanc website but are provided by a commercial partner.

Orthanc is also available as a Beta-package through the package center for Synology NAS users.

See also

 Picture Archiving and Communication System
 DICOM

References

External links
 
 
 
 DCMTK - The DICOM toolkit that is embedded in Orthanc

Medical imaging
Medical software
Free software programmed in C++
Free server software
Free health care software
Free DICOM software